Poiretia is a genus of predatory air-breathing land snails, terrestrial pulmonate gastropod mollusks in the family Spiraxidae.

Distribution 
The distribution of the genus Poiretia is an area from Algeria and Italy to the Caucasus.

Species 
Species within the genus Poiretia include:
 Poiretia algira (Bruguière, 1792) - type species
 Poiretia compressa (Mousson, 1859)
 Poiretia cornea (Brumati, 1838)
 Poiretia delesserti (Bourguignat, 1852)
 Poiretia dilatata (Philippi, 1836)

References 

Spiraxidae